Sona is a village in the municipality of Stjørdal in Trøndelag county, Norway. It lies along the Stjørdalselva river about half-way between the villages of Hegra and Flornes. The Meråkerbanen railway line used to stop here at Sona Station, and the European route E14 highway also runs through the village.

References

Villages in Trøndelag
Stjørdal